Bolsherechye is the name of several inhabited localities in Russia.

Urban localities
Bolsherechye, Omsk Oblast, a work settlement in Bolsherechensky District of Omsk Oblast

Rural localities
Bolsherechye, Novosibirsk Oblast, a selo in Kyshtovsky District of Novosibirsk Oblast